Geobel Pérez Oquendo (born 2 June 1999) is a Cuban professional footballer who plays as both a midfielder and forward.

Club career

Early career
Born in Havana, Pérez began his career in the youth setup of Ciudad de La Habana. In 2018, after performing well during a youth tournament, Pérez was called up to the Ciudad de La Habana first-team in the Campeonato Nacional de Fútbol de Cuba. Later that year, following the CONCACAF U-20 Championship, Pérez defected from Cuba and joined Fortuna SC, an amateur club in Florida which comprises mainly Cuban footballers. Pérez stated that he was the last member of his team to defect that tournament, saying "Others had left in previous games before the tournament was over, I waited until it finished, I even ate with the team and was there until the last day."

In 2019, Pérez joined National Premier Soccer League club Storm, another club comprising mainly Cuban players from Fortuna SC.

Charleston Battery
On 14 January 2021, Pérez signed with USL Championship club Charleston Battery. Prior to his arrival, the Battery had been known for bringing in Cuban players who had defected from previous tournaments, such as Osvaldo Alonso, Maikel Chang, and Heviel Cordovés, and giving them a start to their professional career in the United States. Pérez made his professional debut for the Battery on 7 May 2021 against New York Red Bulls II, coming on as a 76th minute substitute in a 1–1 draw. Pérez featured in 22 matches in his rookie campaign, scoring two goals and notching two assists.

Pérez scored his first goal of 2022 in stoppage time against Atlanta United 2 on June 29, the highlight reel strike earned him USL Championship Goal of the Week honors for Week 17 and a nomination for the league's June Goal of the Month award. The goal was featured by Fútbol Americas in their top 10 goals of the week, coming in at No. 8, during their episode that aired the following day. Pérez was named to the USL Championship Team of the Week for his Week 20 performance against Colorado Springs Switchbacks FC when he scored one goal and one assist in the 3-3 draw on July 22. Following the 2022 season, Pérez was released by Charleston.

International career
Pérez was called into the Cuba under-20 side for the 2018 CONCACAF U-20 Championship. He scored in his nation's first match against Belize, scoring the fourth in a 6–1 victory. He would tally five goals in the tournament, the most all-time for the Cuba U-20s in the competition.

Career statistics

Club

References

External links
 Profile at Charleston Battery

1999 births
Living people
Cuban footballers
Association football forwards
Charleston Battery players
USL Championship players
Cuban expatriate footballers
Cuban expatriate sportspeople in the United States
Expatriate soccer players in the United States
Cuba under-20 international footballers